A36, A 36 or A-36 may refer to:

Aircraft
 A-36 Halcon, a variant of Spanish CASA C-101 fighter aircraft
 North American A-36 Apache, a 1942 American ground-attack/dive bomber aircraft
 Aeroprakt A-36 Vulcan, a light twin-engined aircraft from Ukraine
 Beechcraft A36 Bonanza, a variant of the Beechcraft Bonanza aircraft
 Saab A 36, also known as Projekt 1300, a nuclear strike bomber

Roads
 A36 road, a road connecting Southampton and Bath
 A36 autoroute, a road connecting the German border with Burgundy
 Bundesautobahn 36, a motorway in Germany
 A36 road (Isle of Man), a road connecting the A7 Ballasalla and Port Erin
 A36 road (Northern Ireland), a road in County Antrim connecting Ballymena and Larne
 Autovía A-36, a road connecting Xativá and Alcoy
 A36 road (Sydney), a road in Sydney, much of which follows the course of the Princes Highway between Kogarah and Glebe

Other uses
 A36 steel, a standard alloy specification for structural steel
 HLA-A36, a human serotype
 A36, English Opening code in the Encyclopedia of Chess Openings